Lipoid pneumonia is a specific form of lung inflammation (pneumonia) that develops when lipids enter the bronchial tree. The disorder is sometimes called cholesterol pneumonia in cases where that lipid is a factor.

Signs and symptoms
The pneumonia presents as a foreign body reaction causing cough, dyspnea, and often fever.  Hemoptysis has also been reported.

Causes
Sources of such lipids could be either exogenous or endogenous.

Exogenous 
From outside the body. For example, inhaled nose drops with an oil base, or accidental inhalation of cosmetic oil. Amiodarone is an anti-arrythmic known to cause this condition. Oil pulling has also been shown to be a cause. Fire breather's pneumonia from the inhalation of hydrocarbon fuel is a specific variant. At risk populations include the elderly, developmentally delayed or persons with gastroesophageal reflux.  Switching to water-soluble alternatives may be helpful in some situations.

Tuberculosis 
A secondary tuberculosis in humans often begins as a lipid pneumonia. This may be due to high content of mycolic acid, cord factor, and Wax-D in the cell wall of M. tuberculosis, that has long been speculated to be a virulence factor of the mycobacteria.

Endogenous 
From the body itself, for example, when an airway is obstructed, it is often the case that distal to the obstruction, lipid-laden macrophages and giant cells fill the lumen of the disconnected airspace.

Pathology
The gross appearance of a lipid pneumonia is that in which there is an ill-defined, pale yellow area on the lung. This yellow appearance explains the colloquial term "golden" pneumonia.

At the microscopic scale foamy macrophages and giant cells are seen in the airways, and the inflammatory response is visible in the parenchyma.

Diagnosis

In terms of the evaluation of Lipid pneumonia we find  the following:
Chest X-ray
CT scan
Arterial blood gas (pH)
Bronchoscopy (histological sample)

Management
There are no specific guidelines for the treatment of the disease. Limited evidence suggest that the corticosteroids and possibly intravenous immunoglobulins may improve condition but in the case of exogenous type the stopping of the offending agent is the step that should be take first.

Prognosis
Endogenous lipoid pneumonia and non-specific interstitial pneumonitis has been seen prior to the development of pulmonary alveolar proteinosis in a child.

Epidemiology
Lipid pneumonia has been known to occur in underwater divers after breathing poorly filtered air supplied by a surface compressor lubricated by mineral oil.

History
Laughlen first described lipid pneumonia in 1925 with infants that inhaled oil droplets. It is a condition that has been seen as an occupational risk for commercial diving operations but documented cases are rare.

References

Further reading

External links 

 Gross pathology specimen from the University of Utah

Pneumonia